Cherma's is a major apparel retail store located in Hyderabad, India.

It was started with their brand of shirts and jeans called Cherma's, which became hugely popular because of the affordable prices.

Cherma's has its apparel manufacturing unit located in Apparel Export Park at Gundlapochampally, near Hyderabad...

History
This clothing retail outlet was started by Capt. Kayarmin Pestonji  in 1980 and is synonymous with fashionable ready-made garments. Earlier known as Babsons the first store was opened in Abids. cherma's  made a common low-income group family to wear ready-made garments in 1980 or even today. One of their ads which became popular was "you name it! we have it"

Pestonji family was originally from the small seaport town of Tarapore in the Thana District and settled in Hyderabad 200 years ago. Capt. K.F. Pestonji’s father Late Ferozsha Dadabhoy Pestonji was a senior Government Officer in the state of Hyderabad and retired as Director of Industries. He and his wife had two sons and one daughter. The elder son, Mr. Dadafrid F Pestonji, after completing his MBA from Andhra University has migrated to Bombay in 1965 and is settled in the business of exporting garments. Daughter Mrs Farida S Wadia is married to Mr. Sam F Wadia, who is in the business of manufacturing fire engines and fire fighting equipment at Ahmedabad. Capt. K. F. Pestonji, the youngest remained at Hyderabad, married Ms. Gool H Nakra resident of Secunderabad. They have four children – Cherazad, Maniza, Jasmine and Kaizad.

Capt. K. F. Pestonji started flying at A.P Flying Club in 1967 and got his Commercial Pilot’s Licence in 1970. Flying Instructor training at Hissar, Haryana 1971. Joined AP Flying club in 1972 as a flying instructor

In 1975 started manufacturing Handloom Cloth at Primary Societies located around Hyderabad, for supply to his elder brother D.F. Pestonji, to convert the same as garments and Export. In 1978 Mrs. G.K. Pestonji (who had resigned her job with Canara Bank after the birth of their two daughters) started selling export surplus garments of her brother-in-law, which business grew slowly but steadily and necessitated Capt. K.F. Pestonji resigning his job from the State Government and join in the business.

Capt. Pestonji is a very active National Seeded Motor Rallyist in both two-wheeler and four-wheeler categories, having won a number of National and International events. He has won the first Himalayan Rally in 1980 and the 3rd Himalayan Rally in 1982 in the Indian Cars Class.

He is very actively involved with Community work and nominated Trustee in The Old Parsi Fire Temple Trust. And now he is the President of Dr. Nania Educaitonal Trust which provides education to poor and needy irrespective of the Community.

He is a member of the Local Managing Committee of NIFT

He has served as member of the AP Minorities Commission, Government of Andhra Pradesh from 1991 to 1994 and he has been renominated by the Hon’ble Chief Minister of Andhra Pradesh to the Minorities Commission, which was Statutory body, for the period 1999 to 2002. He is also a member of a committee constituted by A P Red Cross Society.

He is a Member of the Direct Taxes Advisory Committee constituted by the Income Tax Department of Andhra Pradesh.

He is the recipient of the "Samman Patra" award for Andhra Pradesh Region for the Financial Year 1997-98 by the Income Tax Department, Government of India on 30 July 2000.

He is also the recipient of a higher award for the second consecutive year and had been honoured with "Rashtriya Sanman" on National Level for the Financial Year 1998-99 by the Income Tax Department, Government of India on 11 March 2002.

He is a recipient of the "Best Management Award" from the Government of Andhra Pradesh on 1 May 2002, for his outstanding contribution in maintenance of Industrial Relations, Labour Welfare and Productivity.

Management

Kaizad Kayarmin Pestonji 
Being born in a family that was already at the centre of retail business in the city of Hyderabad. Kaizad, from the very beginning had a keen interest in joining the group and heading all its expansion plans. Keeping this in mind, he pursued his Bachelors in Commerce and Computers and followed that up with an MBA from the University Of Warwick which boasts of one of the best MBA Programmes in Europe.

Having graduated in the year 2010, he was very quick to jump into his Business. Along with him, came in a whole new set of Ideas, Goals & Targets.

Kaizad initiated the bringing in of Footwear. A category completely Alien to the Group. This was a huge success and today accounts for over 10% of the Groups Turnover. Apart from this, he has brought in several new and fresh Brands in the Men’s and Children’s wear which contributes huge volumes to the Group. He is also involved in Enhancing & Developing the In-house Brand of Cherma’s such as KAIJAS, SHAMROCK, JASIKA, SIM ONE etc. which are manufactured at our own facility – Singh Casuals Pvt Ltd.

Store
In Hyderabad, they have branches at Secunderabad, Abids, Ameerpet, Kukatpally and Malakpet.

References

Companies based in Hyderabad, India
Indian companies established in 1978
1978 establishments in Andhra Pradesh